The 1996–97 Michigan State Spartans men's basketball team represented Michigan State University in the 1996–97 NCAA Division I men's basketball season. The team played their home games at Breslin Center in East Lansing, Michigan. They were coached by second-year head coach, Tom Izzo, and were members of the Big Ten Conference. The Spartans finished the season with a record of 17–12, 9–9 in Big Ten play to finish in a three-way tie for sixth place. MSU received a bid to the National Invitation Tournament for the second consecutive year where they defeated George Washington in the first round before losing to Florida State in the second round.

As a result of the Big Ten moving to 11 teams with the addition of Penn State in 1992, teams were not guaranteed two games against each other. Accordingly, Michigan and Michigan State, who were only scheduled to play each other once in conference play, chose to play one game against each other that did not count as a conference game. 

The season was also notable as the last season MSU did not make the NCAA tournament (as of 2022).

Previous season
The Spartans finished the 1995–96 season 16–11, 9–9 in Big Ten play to finish in sixth place. Michigan State received an invitation to the NIT and advanced to the second round.

The Spartans lost Quinton Brooks (16.3 points and 5.6 rebounds per game) to graduation and Jamie Feick (10.1 points and 9.5 rebounds per game) to the NBA draft following the season.

Season summary
The Spartans began the season looking for their first trip to the NCAA Tournament since 1995. They were led by freshman Mateen Cleaves (10.2 points and 5.0 assists per game) and seniors Ray Weathers (13.6 points per game) and Jon Garavaglia (10.4 points and 5.9 rebounds per game). The Spartans played no ranked teams in the non-conference season. The non-conference schedule was notable for a triple overtime loss to Detroit Mercy, a game played at Calihan Hall on Detroit's campus. MSU also avenged their 1995 NCAA tournament loss to Weber State by beating the Wildcats in East Lansing. MSU finished the non-conference season at 7–1.

The Spartans opened the Big Ten season with losses to No. 12 Indiana and No. 15 Minnesota. A four-game winning streak followed, but was stopped by a five-game losing streak including losses to No. 13 Michigan in a non-conference matchup and at No. 16 Michigan. The Spartans ended the season on a high note with a win over No. 25 Indiana. The Spartans finished in a tie for sixth place in the conference with a record of 16–11 overall and 9–9 in conference.

The Spartans received an invitation to the NIT for the second consecutive year. MSU beat George Washington in the first round and lost in the second round to Florida State.

Roster and statistics

Schedule and results

|-
!colspan=9 style=| Exhibition

|-
!colspan=9 style=| Regular season

|-
!colspan=6 style=|NIT

References

Michigan State Spartans men's basketball seasons
Michigan State Spartans
Michigan State Spartans men's b
Michigan State Spartans men's b